The Dallas Stars are an American professional ice hockey team based in Dallas, Texas. They play in the Central Division of the Western Conference in the National Hockey League (NHL). The team joined the NHL in 1967 as an expansion team as the Minnesota North Stars, but moved to Dallas in 1993. The Stars won their first Stanley Cup championship in 1999. Having first played at the Reunion Arena, the Stars have played their home games at the American Airlines Center since 2001. There have been eleven general managers in franchise history.

Key

General managers

See also
List of NHL general managers

Notes
 A running total of the number of general managers of the franchise. Thus any general manager who has two or more separate terms as general manager is only counted once.

References

Dallas Stars
General managers
Dallas Stars general managers
General managers
general managers